The Académie des Beaux-Arts (ABA) is a school in Kinshasa, Democratic Republic of the Congo. The school is devoted to teaching the arts, and was founded in 1943 as the École Saint-Luc à Gombe Matadi by Belgian catholic missionary Marc Wallenda. In 1949 the school moved to present-day Kinshasa and in 1957 it was renamed as the Académie des Beaux-Arts. During the education reforms of 1981 the school was integrated into the national technical university system.

The school offers programs in metalworking, interior decorating, visual communications, sculpture, painting, et cetera.

References

Universities in Kinshasa
Arts organizations established in 1943
Universities in the Democratic Republic of the Congo
Educational institutions established in 1943
Education in Kinshasa
Culture of Kinshasa
1943 establishments in the Belgian Congo